Kyai Hajji Zubair Dahlan (born Anwar,; 1905 – November 25, 1969) was an Indonesian ulama of tafsir, fiqh, uṣūl al-fiqh, and tasawwuf from Rembang Regency, Central Java. Every year, in the month of Ramadan, Zubair always routinely teaches the Tafsir al-Jalalayn to his students. In addition, he also active in teaching branches of Arabic grammar and tawhid at the Pesantren Sarang. Zubair is the father of an influential cleric in Indonesia, Maimun Zubair, and a teacher of several Nahdlatul Ulama cleric such as Sahal Mahfudz, and others.

References

Footnotes

Works cited

Further reading

External links
 Pondok Pesantren Al-Anwar official website

1905 births
1969 deaths
People from Rembang Regency
Indonesian Islamic religious leaders
Indonesian Sunni Muslims
Nahdlatul Ulama
Sunni Muslim scholars of Islam